John Short may refer to:
John Rennie Short (born 1951), Scottish geographer and public policy academic
John Tregerthen Short (1858–1933), Australian railway official
John Short (Wisconsin politician) (1874–1951), American politician from Wisconsin
John Short (Kentucky politician) (born 1964), American politician from Kentucky 
John Short (Canadian politician) (1836–1886)
John Short (Irish politician) for Portarlington (Parliament of Ireland constituency)
John Short (Scottish politician), 1640s member of the Parliament of Scotland
John Short (actor) in Regeneration (Star Trek: Enterprise)
John Short (communications theorist), see Social presence theory
John Short (footballer) on List of Sheffield United F.C. managers
John Short (journalist) (born 1937), Canadian sports journalist
John Short (missionary) (born 1939), Australian missionary
James Short (footballer), (born John James Short 1896– c. 1927), English footballer

See also

Jack Short (disambiguation)